Palakkad Railway Colony, or Hemambika Nagar Railway Colony, is a residential colony of the employees of the Palakkad Railway Division of the Southern Railway zone. It is situated in Hemambika Nagar, one of the suburbs of the city, located about 9 km from the centre of the city. It is one of the colonies which are maintained and are under Southern Railway. The only school in Kerala under Southern Railway, Railway High School Palakkad is located inside the colony.

Transportation
There are city buses connecting railway colony with other parts.These bus service starts from Stadium Bus Stand.

References 

 
Suburbs of Palakkad
Cities and towns in Palakkad district
 

Colony